Cake & Ice Cream 2 is the 15th studio album by American rapper Messy Marv. The 2nd album of his Cake & Ice Cream trilogy, it peaked at #39 on the R&B/Hip-Hop Albums chart, #25 on the Heatseekers Albums chart, and at #12 on the Rap Albums chart. It is one of the most successful albums of his career. Cake & Ice Cream 2 includes guest appearances from E-40 and The Jacka, among others, and also performances by Gucci Mane, Mistah F.A.B., Yukmouth & Turf Talk. As of April 2009, it had sold 5,222 copies in the U.S.

"Talk Baseball" and "Killa" are both diss tracks at cousin/rapper San Quinn, while Quinn himself appears on Cake & Ice Cream 2 and disses Messy Marv in a song called "Fence Hopper".

According to Allmusic, "The Fillmore District’s own Messy Marv never rests, as he gives hungry fans another taste of his unique West Coast flavor on the mixtape release Cake & Ice Cream 2. The album documents the beef between Marv and fellow Bay Area representative San Quinn with each rapper throwing shots on solo diss tracks (San Quinn labels Marv a “Fence Hopper” and Marv gets personal on “Killa”). A handful of respected northern Cali artists also put in guest appearances."

Track listing

References

2009 albums
Messy Marv albums
Sequel albums